The following are trademarks, service marks, or collective membership marks that the Church of Scientology and affiliated organizations claim to own, some of which are registered in some nations. Additional notes are provided in parentheses after the trademark. Non-English trademarks the same thing but are listed under their English-language equivalents.

Religious Technology Center
Religious Technology Center (RTC) is the primary manager of Scientology intellectual property. It is headed by David Miscavige.

 Advance! (magazine)
 Applied Philosophy
 ARC Straightwire (ARC stands for affinity-reality-communication)
 ARC Fil Direct
 Audited NOTs (NOT stands for NED [New Era Dianetics] Operating Thetan)
 The Auditor
 Book 1 (nickname for the book Dianetics: The Modern Science of Mental Health)
 Book One
 The Bridge
 El Puente
 Le Pont
 
 
 Cause
 Celebrity
 Celebrity Centre (special Scientology facilities for celebrities)
 Centro de Celebridades
 Centre
 Clear Certainty Rundown
 Clear View
 Clearsound (sound reproduction technology)
 Dianetics
 Dajnetika
 Dianetica
 Dianetique
 La Dianétique
 Dianetiikka
 Dianetik (Swedish)
 Dianetika
 Dianetyka
 
 Διανοητική
 
 
 
 [Dianetics in Korean]
 [Dianetics in Ukrainian]
 [Dianetics in Urdu]
 Дианетика
 Dianética
 E-Meter
 [E-Meter in Greek]
 [E-Meter in Hebrew]
 False Purpose Rundown
 Recorrido del Proposito Falso
 Rundown des Faux Buts
 [False Purpose Rundown in Hebrew]
 FEBC (stands for Flag Executive Briefing Course)
 Flag
 旗
 The Flag Land Base
 Flag OT Executive Rundown (OT is stands for Operating Thetan)
 Recorrido de Flag de OT Ejecutivo
 Freedom (magazine)
 Freewinds
 Golden Era Productions (film production company)
 Goldline
 Happiness Rundown
 Recorrido de la Felicidad
 Silverwood Properties
 Rundown du Bonheur
 [Happiness Rundown in Greek]
 [Happiness Rundown in Hebrew]
 [Happiness Rundown in katakana]
 HCO (stands for Hubbard Communication Office)
 High Winds
 HQS (stands for Hubbard Qualified Scientologist)
 HRD (stands for Happiness Rundown)
 Hubbard
 [Hubbard in Chinese]: 賀伯特
 [Hubbard in Cyrillic]: Хаббард
 [Hubbard in Greek]
 [Hubbard in Hebrew]
 [Hubbard in katakana]
 [Hubbard in Korean]
 Hubbard Life Orientation
 INCOMM (stands for International Network of Computer Organized Management [sic])
 Key to Life
 KSW News(KSW stands for Keeping Scientology Working)
 La Clé de la vie
 Llave de la Vidad
 [Key to Life in katakana]
 L. Ron Hubbard
 [L. Ron Hubbard in Chinese]: L.·羅恩·賀伯特
 [L. Ron Hubbard in Cyrillic]: Л. Рон Хаббард
 [L. Ron Hubbard in katakana:] L・ロン・ハバード
 L. Ronald Hubbard
 L10
 L11
 L12
 Life Improvement
 Life Orientation
 [Life Orientation in katakana]
 Life Repair
 LRH (stands for Lafayette Ronald Hubbard)
 [LRH in Greek]
 Mark V (E-Meter model)
 Mark Super VII (E-Meter model)
 Mark Super VII Quantum (E-Meter model)
 Method One
 Methode Un
 Metodo Uno
 [Method One in Greek]
 NED (stands for "New Era Dianetics")
 [NED in Hebrew]
 New Era
 New Era Dianetics
 Dianetique de Nouvel Age
 [New Era Dianetics in katakana]
 New Life Rundown
 New Vitality Rundown
 NOTs (stands for NED [New Era Dianetics] Operating Thetan")</small>
 [NOTs in Hebrew]
 [NOTs in katakana]
 [NOTs in Korean]
 OCA (stands for Oxford Capacity Analysis)
 OEC (stands for Organization Executive Course)
 Operating Thetan OT (stands for Operating Thetan)
 Oxford Capacity Analysis (personality test)
 Oyotetsugaku Purification Purification Rundown Recorrido de Purificacao Recorrido de Purificacion Rundown de Purification [Purification Rundown in Greek]
 [Purification Rundown in katakana]
 Religious Technology Center Saint Hill Manor Scientology Cienciologia Cientologia Scientologi Scientologia Scientologie La Scientologie Szcientologia [Scientologia in Cyrillic]
 [Scientology in Chinese]: 山達基
 [Scientology in Cyrillic]: Саентология
 [Scientology in Greek]
 [Scientology in Hebrew]
 [Scientology in Hindi]
 [Scientology in katakana:] サイエントロジー
 [Scientology in Korean]
 [Scientology in Urdu]
 Scientology Today Scientometric SHSBC (stands for Saint Hill Special Briefing Course)
 Solo NOTs <small>(NOT is stands for NED [New Era Dianetics] Operating Thetan")
 [Solo NOTs in Hebrew]
 Source
 Standard Admin
 Standard Tech
 Student Hat
 Chapeau de l'Etudiant
 [Student Hat in Greek]
 [Student Hat in Hebrew]
 Sunshine Rundown
 Recorrido del Resplandor
 Rundown du Soleil
 [Sunshine Rundown in Hebrew]
 [Sunshine Rundown in katakana]
 Super Power
 Theta
 Truth Revealed
the Celebrity Centre logo
the Celebrity Centre International logo
the Class III Auditor badge
the Class IV Auditor badge
the Class V Auditor badge
the Class V Auditor Graduate badge
the Class V Org corporate symbol
the Class VIII Auditor badge
the Clearsound logo
the CSI corporate symbol (CSI is stands for Church of Scientology International)
the Dianetics symbol
the Dianetics symbol in a circle
the Division 6 symbol
Fast Flow Student symbol
the Flag Crew symbol
the Flag Service Org corporate symbol
the Flag Ship Service Org symbol
the Freewinds logo
the Golden Age of Tech symbol
the Golden Era Productions symbol
the Hat in Life symbol
the HCO badge
the I HELP symbol (I HELP is stands for International Hubbard Ecclesiastical League of Pastors)
the INCOMM symbol
the Key to Life symbol
the L. Ron Hubbard signature
the Life Hat symbol
The Lion symbol
the LRH device (stands for Lafayette Ronald Hubbard)
the LRH signet
the LRH Classics symbol
the Manor Hotel logo (part of the Los Angeles Celebrity Centre)
the Mark V E-Meter symbol
the Mark Super VII Quantum configuration
the Mark Super VII Quantum symbol
the New Flag Ship Org logo
the New World Corps logo
the OT symbol (OT stands for Operating Thetan)
the OT symbol in wreath
the OT Ambassador symbol
the OT Universe Corps symbol
the Power pin
the Professional TRs symbol (TR is stands for Training Routine)
the Release pin
the Religious Technology Center corporate symbol
the Ron signature
the Saint Hill Special Briefing Course symbol
the Scientologist On-Line logo
the pointed Scientology cross
the rounded Scientology cross
the Scientology symbol
the Scientology Missions International logo
the Sea Horse symbol
the Sea Org symbol
the Solo Auditor symbol
the Standard Admin badge
the Standard Ethics symbol
the Super Power symbol
the Universe Corps symbol
the Volunteer Minister symbol

Affiliated organizations

Association for Better Living and Education International
Association for Better Living and Education (ABLE) is an educational and drug rehabilitation organization.
 ABLE
 Applied Scholastics
 Criminon
 Effective Education Publishing
 Narconon
the ABLE logo
the Applied Scholastics open book design
the Criminon design
the Effective Education Publishing design
the Narconon design

Author Services Inc.
Author Services Inc. is the administrator of L. Ron Hubbard's fiction works.
 Author Services Inc.
 Battlefield Earth
 Terl
the Battlefield Earth logo

Bridge Publications, Inc.
Bridge Publications, Inc. is the U.S. publisher of L. Ron Hubbard's nonfiction works. From 1983 to 2002, Bridge also published Hubbard's fiction works.
 Bridge Publications, Inc.

Citizens Commission on Human Rights
The Citizens Commission on Human Rights (CCHR) is a psychiatry watchdog organization.
 CCHR
 Citizens Commission on Human Rights
the CCHR logo

Delphi Schools, Inc.
Delphi Schools, Inc. operates private schools that use study methods devised by L. Ron Hubbard.
 Delphi Academy
 Delphi Schools, Inc.
 The Delphian School

Hubbard College of Administration
Hubbard College of Administration is a business college which teaches methods devised by L. Ron Hubbard.
the tiger symbol

International Foundation for Human Rights and Tolerance
International Foundation for Human Rights and Tolerance is an organization promoting human rights awareness.
 the International Foundation for Human Rights and Tolerance logo

L. Ron Hubbard Library
Church of Spiritual Technology, doing business as L. Ron Hubbard Library, owns the copyrights to L. Ron Hubbard's texts, and these trademarks.
 Illustrators of the Future
 Mission Earth
 The Way to Happiness
 Writers of the Future
 the L. Ron Hubbard Gallery logo
 the Mission Earth fist and glove logo
 The Way to Happiness "road and sun" design

World Institute of Scientology Enterprises
World Institute of Scientology Enterprises (WISE) is an organization of businesspeople who use L. Ron Hubbard's methods in their business.
 Model of Admin Know-How
 Prosperity (magazine)
 WISE
the lioness and cubs logo
the WISE logo

Unattributed
"New Era is a trademark and a service mark."
"Scientologist is a collective membership mark designating members of the affiliated churches and missions of Scientology."

 Resourceful Construction, Inc.
CEDAR LOT, LLC
 Pacific Heart LLC
 Talley-Ho Ventures
 KPS RE, LLC
 TRIO RE, LLC
Silverwood Properties, Inc.
 AA RE, LLC
 SHUCKS, LLC
Son of Judd Construction
 Resourceful DEVELOPMENTS, Inc.
 RJW LLC
Ken Shapiro Llc
 CHENEY SHAPIRO 401K
LANTZMAN Management
Lantzman Investment
Marcuson Tree Management
Joyce Essex Harvey Coldwell Bankers International

See also
 Symbols of Scientology

External links
 ScientologyToday - RTC:  Dianetics and Scientology Trademarks
 Scientology: trademark information
 Religious Technology Center: trademark information
 ABLE: trademark information
 Chart of current USPTO trademark information

Scientology
Trademarks